Jean-François Bernard (born 2 May 1962) is a French former professional road bicycle racer.

Career

He turned professional in 1984 for La Vie Claire, led by Bernard Hinault. He was seen as Hinault’s successor as a winner of stage races from 1986.

He competed in the team time trial event at the 1984 Summer Olympics.

Bernard wore the yellow jersey as leader of the general classification in the 1987 Tour de France and won two stages, both time trials, including one on Mont Ventoux. He finished the race third behind Stephen Roche of Ireland and Pedro Delgado of Spain and was in contention all the way to the end in what still remains among the closest Tours in history.

He won three stages in the 1988 Giro d'Italia  and led the race, but he crashed in a tunnel, injured his back and abandoned the race. The next year he needed an operation and months of recuperation for fibrosis in his left knee.

A saddle sore and another operation forced him out of the 1990 Tour de France. He never again challenged in the grands tours. In 1991 he joined the Spanish team, Banesto which had two leaders for stage races in Delgado and Miguel Indurain. Bernard helped Indurain dominate the Tour.

Bernard won the 1992 Paris–Nice.

Bernard retired at the end of 1996 with 52 professional wins. He is now a consultant for L'Équipe, L'Équipe TV and Eurosport. In 2005 a race, La Jean-François Bernard, was organised in the Nièvre region of Bourgogne as part of the Trophy of Bourgogne, an amateur competition. He is the father of racing cyclist Julien Bernard.

Career achievements

Major results

1983
 1st  Road race, National Amateur Road Championships
1984 
 5th Overall Tour de l'Avenir
1985
 1st Stage 6a Tour de Suisse 
 3rd Trofeo Baracchi
 5th Grand Prix des Nations
 9th Overall Critérium International
 10th Overall Tour du Limousin 
1st Stage 2
 10th Overall Tour de l'Avenir
 10th Clásica de San Sebastián
1986
 1st  Overall Tour Méditerranéen
1st Stage 5a (ITT)
 1st Coppa Sabatini
 1st Châteauroux Classic de l'Indre Trophée Fenioux
 1st Stage 16 Tour de France
 1st Prologue Tour d'Armorique
 2nd Overall Tour de Romandie
1st Prologue & Stage 5b (ITT)
 3rd Grand Prix des Nations
 3rd Gran Piemonte
 5th Overall Critérium International
 6th Grand Prix de Cannes
 7th Overall Critérium du Dauphiné Libéré
1st Prologue & Stage 7b (ITT)
 7th Overall Paris–Nice
 9th Tour du Nord-Ouest
1987
 1st Giro dell'Emilia
 1st Grand Prix de Rennes
 1st Stage 19 Giro d'Italia
 2nd Overall Paris–Nice
1st Stage 4 
 2nd Circuit de l'Aulne
 2nd Grand Prix des Nations
 3rd Overall Tour de France
1st  Combination classification
1st Stages 18 (ITT) & 24 (ITT)
 7th Overall Critérium International
 10th Critérium des As
1988
 1st Grand Prix d'Aix-en-Provence
 Giro d'Italia
1st Stages 1 (ITT), 8 & 15 
 5th Overall Tour de Romandie
 9th Overall Circuit de la Sarthe 
1989
 1st Stage 2 Tour du Vaucluse
1990
 1st Stage 15 (ITT) Vuelta a España
 1st Stage 7b (ITT) Paris–Nice
 7th Overall Herald Sun Tour
1st Stage 7 
 7th Grand Prix de Wallonie
1991
 1st Circuit de l'Aulne
 3rd Polynormande
 4th La Flèche Wallonne
 6th Overall Tour du Limousin
 7th Overall Circuit de la Sarthe 
 8th Giro dell'Appennino
1992
 1st  Overall Paris–Nice
1st Stage 7b (ITT)
 1st  Overall Critérium International
 1st  Overall Circuit de la Sarthe
1st Stage 4a (ITT)
 1st Polynormande
 2nd Trofeo Comunidad Foral de Navarra
 3rd Liège–Bastogne–Liège
 5th Overall Volta a Catalunya
1st Stage 3
 7th Overall Tour du Limousin
 10th Road race, UCI Road World Championships
1993
 1st  Overall Circuit de la Sarthe
1st Stage 4a (ITT)
 2nd GP Ouest–France
 8th Overall Tour du Limousin
1st Stage 2
 8th Subida a Urkiola
1994
 8th Overall Paris–Nice

Grand Tour general classification results timeline

References

External links
 
 

1962 births
Living people
French male cyclists
French Tour de France stage winners
French Giro d'Italia stage winners
French Vuelta a España stage winners
Sportspeople from Nièvre
Tour de Suisse stage winners
Cyclists at the 1984 Summer Olympics
Olympic cyclists of France
Cyclists from Bourgogne-Franche-Comté